Hantman is a surname. Notable people with the surname include:

Alan Hantman (born 1942), American architect 
Murray Hantman (1904–1999), American painter, muralist, and teacher
Perla Tabares Hantman (born 1936), Cuban-American school board member